Suzuki is a Japanese multinational corporation.

Suzuki may also refer to:

Suzuki (surname), a Japanese surname
Suzuki Musical Instrument Corporation, a Japanese company that produces musical instruments
Suzuki (album), an album by duo Tosca
Suzuki (fish) (also Japanese sea bass), a fish of the family Lateolabracidae

See also
Suzuki reaction, a Nobel Prize–winning cross-coupling chemical reaction 
Suzuki sporadic group, in group theory
Suzuki method, a philosophy of music education, which had been run by Shinichi Suzuki
Suzuki method (actor training), a method of actor training, innovated by Tadashi Suzuki 
The Mooney Suzuki, an American garage rock band
Tsuzuki (disambiguation)
Suzuka (disambiguation)